Johan Lapeyre (born August 3, 1985 in Le Plessis-Bouchard) is a French professional football player, who currently plays for Montceau Bourgogne.

Career
He played two games in the Ligue 1 for AS Nancy.

Notes

External links

1985 births
Living people
French footballers
Ligue 1 players
AS Nancy Lorraine players
Entente SSG players
US Sarre-Union players
Association football goalkeepers